In the elections to the Massachusetts State Senate in 2010, the Democrats continued their dominance, winning 36 seats against 4 seats for the Republicans.

Election results

See also
 2011–2012 Massachusetts legislature
 List of Massachusetts General Courts

References
 

State Senate
Senate 2010
Massachusetts Senate
Massachusetts Senate